Dmitri Tomashevich (Дмитрий Томашевич; born 6 March 1974) is a former tennis player from Uzbekistan, who represented his native country at the 1996 Summer Olympics in Atlanta, Georgia, where he was defeated in the first round by Slovakia's Karol Kučera. The right-hander reached his highest singles ATP-ranking on June 5, 1996, when he became the number 261 of the world. He has been the Uzbekistan Fed Cup coach for Uzbekistan since 2013. He led the Fed Cup team with relatively decent records including 2–0 against Hong Kong Fed Cup 1–0 against Japan Fed Cup, 2–1 against Chinese Taipei, 2–2 against Korea Fed Cup, and 1–1 against Thailand Fed Cup.

External links
 
 

1974 births
Living people
Uzbekistani male tennis players
Tennis players at the 1996 Summer Olympics
Olympic tennis players of Uzbekistan
Sportspeople from Tashkent
Uzbekistani people of Russian descent
Asian Games medalists in tennis
Tennis players at the 1994 Asian Games
Tennis players at the 1998 Asian Games
Tennis players at the 2002 Asian Games
Asian Games bronze medalists for Uzbekistan
Medalists at the 1998 Asian Games
Medalists at the 2002 Asian Games
20th-century Uzbekistani people
21st-century Uzbekistani people